The Chairman of the Assembly of Kosovo (literally translated as President of the Assembly of Kosovo, or , literally translated as Speaker of the Parliament, Serbian: / , literally translated as President of the Assembly of Kosovo) is the chair of Assembly of the Republic of Kosovo, who is elected by the parliament during the opening session. The position also ranks first in the presidential line of succession. The current Chairman of the Assembly of Kosovo is Glauk Konjufca.

Chairmen of the Assembly of Kosovo

See also
History of Kosovo
List of presidents of the Assembly of Kosovo
Politics of Kosovo

Notes 

Politics of Kosovo
Kosovo
Chairmen of the Assembly of the Republic of Kosovo